Topics in Cognitive Science (also stylized as topiCS) is a quarterly peer-reviewed scientific journal covering cognitive science. It was established in 2009, with its first issue published in January of that year. It is published by Wiley-Blackwell in a partnership with the Cognitive Science Society. The editor-in-chief is Andrea Bender (University of Bergen). According to the Journal Citation Reports, the journal has a 2017 impact factor of 2.284, ranking it 35th out of 85 journals in the category "Psychology, Experimental".

References

External links

Cognitive science journals
Quarterly journals
Wiley-Blackwell academic journals
Publications established in 2009
English-language journals
Academic journals published by learned and professional societies of the United States